Protein FAM208B (family with sequence similarity 208 member b) is a protein that in humans is encoded by the FAM208B gene.  The gene is also known as "chromosome 10 open reading frame 18" (c10orf18).  FAM208B is expressed throughout the body however its function has not been established.  FAM208b has been observed to be differentially regulated in various cancers and throughout development. While the exact role of the protein is yet to be established, the significant presence of the protein within humans and throughout the phylogenetic tree depicts a central importance of the gene in normal function.

Gene
The gene is located on chromosome 10 at position 10p15.1. FAM208b is upstream of ankryn repeat and SOCS box containing 13 (ASB13), and downstream of the GDP dissociation inhibitor 2 (GDI2) and nuclear receptor binding factor 2 pseudogene 5 (NRBF2P5). ASBI13 and GDI2 are both found on the opposite strand of FAM208b, while NRBF2P5 is on the same strand.

Homology and Evolution

Paralog
FAM208b has a single paralog, FAM208a. FAM208a is also known as "retinoblastoma-associated protein 140", "Transgene Activation Suppression Protein" (TASOR), "CTCL Tumor Antigen", and "chromosome 3 open reading frame 63" (c3orf63).

Orthologs
FAM208b is conserved only in vertebrates. Orthologs can be found in mammals, reptiles, and amphibians. Distant homologs, including orthologs of the paralog, FAM208a, are observed in bony fish and sharks.

Homologous Domains
FAM208b has highly conserved N- and C- termini and a less conserved central region. Three domains of unknown function (DUFs) are found within the protein, including one DUF 3699 and two DUF 3715. All three DUFs are conserved between species. DUF 3715 is found in the paralog of FAM208b.

Evolution
The change in amino acids over time of FAM208b indicates that it is a rapidly evolving gene. The presence of FAM208a but not FAM208b in bony fish and sharks but not FAM208b, indicates that the paralogs split about 325 million years ago.

Transcription

Promoter
Two promoter regions for FAM208b can be observed. The earlier promoter region is regulated by numerous transcription factors. The promoter contains binding sites for Ikaros2, Nuclear Factor Y, and at least three binding sites for Pleomorphic adenoma gene 1.

The second promoter region is found within the first intron and encodes a slightly shorter mRNA. This promoter contains multiple binding sites for the FOXP1 transcription factor.

mRNA
The mRNA of the most common peptide (variant x2) is 8699 nucleotides long and includes 22 exons.

Binding Proteins
The 5' UTR is bound by the RNA binding proteins RBMX1, FUS, SFRS1, ACO1, and NONO. The 3' UTR is bound by EIF4B, A2BP1, and ZFP36. A single non-coding variant of FAM208b is transcribed. This sequence is partially complementary to the human gene PCNX1.

Transcript Variants
A total of 20 transcript variants of FAM208b, including one non-coding RNA have been observed. While multiple splice variants are present, 18 exons, composing for 7089 base pairs that code for 2331 amino acids, are present in all coding variants. This constitutes approximately 82.1% of the most common transcript variant (X2), and 95.6% of its polypeptide product. The most commonly skipped exon is Exon 12 (position ch10: 5735304-5735546). Multiple variants have alternative transcription start sites, indicative of an internal promoter sequence.

Protein

Biochemistry
The primary isoform of FAM208b consists of 2430 amino acids. The total molecular weight is 268.86 kD. FAM208b has an isoelectric point of 5.72. FAM208b has an instability index of 53.64, making it a relatively unstable protein in the unphosphorylated form.

Primary Structure
FAM208b has a unique amino acid composition. An above-average proportion of serine residues are observed (11.1%). This indicates a potential role in intracellular signaling.

Secondary Structure
FAM208b is predicted to have multiple alpha-helical domains. It is predicted that 25% of the protein forms alpha-helices, 15% forms beta-strands, and 60% is random coil. The various DUF domains are predicted to have variable structure. DUF3699 consists of two helices and four beta-strands. The N-terminal DUF3715 appears to form a stretch of random coil, while the C-terminal DUF3715 has two helices and four beta-strands.

Tertiary Structure

A tertiary structure has not yet been confirmed by X-ray crystallography. Predictions of tertiary structure indicate a modular protein, composed of three modules connected by random coil.

Post-Translational Modifications

Phosphorylation
FAM208b has 13 experimentally confirmed phosphorylation sites on serine residues. The high serine content of FAM208b suggests a role in intracellular signaling.

SUMOylation
FAM208b has potential for SUMOylation SUMOylation has been observed to play a role in nuclear transport, which would aid FAM208b's localization prediction.

Glycosylation
FAM208b is predicted to be an intracellular protein, indicating that it is not glycosylated.

SubCellular Location
FAM208b is predicted to be localized to the cytosol or nucleus. The peptide sequence lacks a signal sequence either at the N-terminus or internally. No transmembrane domains have been observed or predicted, indicating that FAM208b is not secreted or found in the cell membrane, and is very likely to be intracellular. A Nuclear Localization Signal is observed at amino acids 393-403. The NLS is highly conserved in mammals, birds, and reptiles.

Clinical Significance

Development
FAM208b expression is observed to decrease over the course of development. Peak expression is observed in the blastocyst. A sharp decline in expression is observed at the fetal stage, after which expression is maintained at constant levels through adulthood.

Pathology
FAM208b has been observed to be correlated in a variety of cancers. The locus of FAM208b (10p15.1) was identified as an aberration site present in translocation-positive Follicular lymphoma but not Nodal Marginal Zone Lymphoma. FAM208b has also been identified as being upregulated significantly and prominently in Non-Hodgkin lymphoma cells. FAM208b has been identified as a hub gene of Stage IV colorectal cancer. A fusion of FAM208b and PLEKHB1 has been validated as candidate for fusion of chromosomes 10 and 11 in Donor Cell Leukemia.
FAM208b has also been separately observed to be differentially expressed in a variety of cancers. A decrease in transcription of FAM208b has been observed in adrenal cancer, bladder cancer, breast cancer, gastrointestinal cancer, glial cancer, kidney cancer, lymph cancer, skin cancer, muscle cancer, and uterine cancer. An increase in transcription of FAM208b has been observed in cervical cancer, leukemia, liver cancer, lung cancer, and prostate cancer.

FAM208b has also been found to be expressed at higher levels in Acute Macular Degeneration.

FAM208b has been observed to be downregulated in bronchial epithelial cells infected by respiratory syncytial virus and has been postulated as a biosignature of the infection.

References